Marie Rachel Salman Taleon-Lagdameo (born March 4, 1969), known professionally as Dawn Zulueta, is a Filipino actress, host and commercial model. She was recognized as the only Filipino actor to win two different major accolades in acting categories in a single year when she won Best Actress and Best Supporting Actress in the 1992 FAMAS Awards. She also appeared in Manila Standard  Top 10 Filipina actresses of the 1990s list of 1999.

Career
Zulueta was spotted in a Close-Up television commercial in 1986 opposite Tonton Gutierrez. She then started her film career in Nakagapos na Puso (1986) alongside Sharon Cuneta and Lorna Tolentino. She also had roles in television series like Okay Ka, Fairy Ko! (1995–1997) as the lead character's wife, drama series Davao (1990), and became a regular female co-host on the musical variety show GMA Supershow (1989).

She branched out hosting other musical-variety shows like The Dawn and Jimmy Show (1989) and RSVP (1990). During the early years of her career, she was cast in comedy films like Bondying (1988) starring Jimmy Santos, and Alyas Batman en Robin (1991) with Joey de Leon and Keempee de Leon. Zulueta's played the lead opposite Richard Gomez in the romantic drama Hihintayin Kita sa Langit (1991) playing ill-fated lovers.

Zulueta holds the distinction of winning both the FAMAS Awards for Best Lead Actress (Hihintayin Kita sa Langit) and Best Supporting Actress (Una Kang Naging Akin) in 1992, making her the only Filipino actor to ever to win two different major accolades in acting categories in a single year. She also won a Luna Award as Supporting Actress of the Year for the film Una Kang Naging Akin. In 1994, Zulueta received the Box Office Entertainment Award for Box Office Queen for the film The Maggie Dela Riva Story...God Why Me?

In 1993, Zulueta received two Best Actress awards from the Metro Manila Film Festival and FAMAS. In 1994, the Philippine Movie Press Club (PMPC) Star Awards for Movies for Buhay ng Buhay Ko. Further, she has received multiple nominations (for both lead and supporting roles) from the prestigious Manunuri ng Pelikulang Pilipino (MPP) Gawad Urian.

In 1996, Zulueta starred with Sheryl Cruz and Charlene Gonzales in the hit drama-vengeance film Ikaw Naman Ang Iiyak for Viva Films in a lead role as Elaine, which became a career booster as a lead actress. In the same year, Zulueta was cited in a Manila Times article as the 10th Best Filipino Actress from 1990 to 1996. In addition, a 1999 Manila Standard article named her as one of the Top 10 Actresses of the 1990s.

In 2010, Zulueta took the lead role in a stage musical, A Little Night Music. In 2011, she made a comeback television show the remake of Mula Sa Puso, which she's plays Magda, who originally played by Jaclyn Jose.

In 2012, ABS-CBN launched Walang Hanggan which starred Zulueta, Gomez, Coco Martin, and Julia Montes. The show was noted to be a reboot of the Gomez-Zulueta film Hihintayin Kita Sa Langit.

She also portrayed the lead character's older version in the 2014 film, She's Dating the Gangster where she acted opposite Gomez, along with lead stars Kathryn Bernardo and Daniel Padilla. She then played another lead role in the drama The Love Affair in 2015 under the direction of Nuel C. Naval and a screenplay by Vanessa R. Valdez.

Opposite Gomez, Zulueta played Marian Fontanilla in the 2015–2016 soap opera, You're My Home. The show became her and Gomez's last collaboration up to date.

In 2016, Zulueta worked with Piolo Pascual and Coleen García in Love Me Tomorrow as directed by Gino M. Santos. Gomez also made a special appearance in the film. In the same year, Zulueta played as first lady Marissa Hidalgo in Ang Probinsyano. Her appearance on the show became a reunion project for her, and colleagues  Martin, Edu Manzano, and Alice Dixson.

She played as Andrea Balatbat, a character opposite Vic Sotto's in the 2017 OctoArts movie, Meant to Beh.

Zulueta played the character of May Dela Cruz in the 2019 drama Family History.

Personal life
She is of Palestinian descent. Her grandfather, George Anton Salman, was a Palestinian-Arab who came to the Philippines after the Second World War.

She is married to Antonio Lagdameo, Jr. They have two children namely Jacobo Antonio (born 2005), and Ayisha Madlen (born 2009).

Filmography

Film

Television

Awards and nominations

References

External links

1969 births
Living people
20th-century Filipino actresses
21st-century Filipino actresses
Filipino television variety show hosts
GMA Network personalities
ABS-CBN personalities
Actresses from Manila
Filipino female models
Filipino people of Lebanese descent
Filipino people of Palestinian descent
Visayan people
Viva Artists Agency